Euphaedra plantroui, or Plantrou's forester, is a butterfly in the family Nymphalidae. It is found in Ivory Coast. The habitat consists of forests.

References

Butterflies described in 1981
plantroui
Endemic fauna of Ivory Coast
Butterflies of Africa